Klára Kučerová (a pseudonym for Lucie Hušková) is a Czech writer, interpreter and translator, born on 14 September 1972, in Pardubice. Currently living in Italy, she worked as a forensic interpreter and a conference interpreter, specializing in odontology. Hušková began her literary work with publications of language manuals before she wrote three novels in Italian. One of them, Imperfette Sintonie [Imperfect Harmonies], based on a famous football case, was published by Bonfirraro. Her latest book, Ike, is written in Czech. It is a humorous memoir about her disastrous life in Italy, as seen through the eyes of a cane corso (an Italian breed of large dog). It was immediately bought by a Czech Publisher (Prah) and was published in Prague in April 2017.

Publications

As  Lucie Hušková 
 Il ceco: un gioco da ragazzi [Czech: Child's Play] (Dante Alighieri, 2012)
 Parlare il ceco a Praga [Speaking Czech in Prague] (Dante Alighieri, 2012)
 Il Russo testi accentati-fraseologia [Russian: Accented Texts - Phraseology] (Bonfirraro, 2014)
 Intenzivní kurz italské konverzace: Parlando s'impara [Intensive course in Italian conversation: Learn as you speak] (Albatrosmedia.cz, 2015)
Ike by Prah https://www.prah.cz/  A surprisingly original and intelligent story, defined by clarity and panache.
Through amusing descriptions of the protagonist’s sentimental misadventures and the antics of her household pets, the author highlights how the good things in life – such as love for our children and pets – can become our sheet anchor.

Audience
Lovers of humour
Fans of dogs and other pets
Women of all ages, who may see the author as a sort of “heroine” with whom they can identify. They might even concede that living in Italy is not always a bed of roses!

What they say about Ike...
“A refreshing book you’ll read with a permanent smile on your face”. Ike's perception of the world of humans, and particularly of his adoptive Mummy's, informs this humorous tale of people's sometimes less-than-brilliant or downright miserable existential ups and downs. An account of life in Italy, of the Country itself, and of the character of its inhabitants. Like a cocktail of sparkling thoughts and events, the narrative is guaranteed to provide readers with genuine entertainment. A humour reminiscent of Stephen Clark’s delightfully funny A Year in the Merde.
The writer has an enormous gift – her ability to take a detached, “bird's eye” view, not only of others and of sensitive situations in general, but above all of herself. And this is extremely rare.”
Anna Novotná (editor at Práh publishing company)

As Klára Kučerová 
 Imperfette sintonie [Imperfect Harmonies] (Bonfirraro, 2016)

Reviews 
Kučerová's Imperfette sintonie has been reviewed several times by SportPeople.net. Inspired by the true story of Antonio Speziale, a minor who was indicted on charges of manslaughter in the death of Filippo Raciti, the story presents a fictionalized account of Speziale's trial and wrongful (as argued by the book) conviction.

Reviews:
http://www.podporaceskychautoru.cz/2018/05/recenze-ike-muj-italsky-corso-pes-aneb.html   **  **   http://www.klubknihomolu.cz/138576/s-humorem-jde-vse-lepe/   **  **   https://www.databazeknih.cz/recenze/ike-muj-italsky-corso-pes-aneb-psi-zivot-v-italii-334227   **  **   https://www.cbdb.cz/kniha-194880-ike-muj-italsky-corso-pes-

References

External links 
www.luciehuskova.com

Living people
1972 births
Czech women novelists
Writers from Pardubice
21st-century Czech novelists
21st-century Czech women writers
21st-century pseudonymous writers
Pseudonymous women writers